Hagelberg FH 50 is a .50 BMG, single shot bolt-action bullpup precision rifle manufactured by Hagelberg Arms. The rifle is designed for both target shooting and law enforcement use, and comes in two lengths, variant L (Long) and variant K (Short). The rifle can also come with a sound suppressor and short range back-up sights.

See also
 Firearms, List of firearms
 .50 BMG
 Bolt action
 Single shot

References

External links
 Entry on hagelbergarms.dk

Single-shot bolt-action rifles
.50 BMG sniper rifles
Bullpup rifles